This is a list of events at the Rhythmic Gymnastics Grand Prix series.

Editions 

Note An asterisk (*) indicates that group performances were competed at the Grand Prix Final but were not officially part of the GPF series, being considered a parallel event competed at the same time and on the same venue as the GPF event.

1994–1999 

1994

1995

1996

1997

1998

1999

2000–2009 

2000

2001

2002

2003

2004

2005

2006

2007

2008

2009

2010–2019 

2010

2011

2012

2013

2014

2015

2016

2017

2018

2019

2020–2023

2020

2021

2022

2023

See also
 Rhythmic Gymnastics Grand Prix Series
 List of medalists at the Rhythmic Gymnastics Grand Prix Final

References 

Rhythmic Gymnastics Grand Prix events
Rhythmic Gymnastics Grand Prix